Carlos Mauricio was a professor of Agricultural Sciences at the University of El Salvador until his extrajudicial kidnapping by Salvadoran death squads in June 1983. He was tortured by the military under the command of then Minister of Defense, Gen. Carlos Eugenio Vides Casanova. On his release, he fled to the U.S., where his first job was as a dishwasher. He learned English and earned a graduate Certificate in Molecular Genetics, a teaching credential and an MA in Adult Education. In 2002, supported by the Center for Justice and Accountability, he won a lawsuit against General Vides Casanova for Casanova's command responsibility in Mauricio's kidnapping and torture.  Mauricio was awarded significant punitive and compensatory damages against Vides Casanova.  Vides Casanova is one of many Salvadoran human rights abusers with links to the notorious School of the Americas at Fort Benning, Georgia, and in 1985 was a guest speaker at the school.

Since the trial, Prof. Mauricio has devoted his time to human rights advocacy. In March 2006, he was part of a School of the Americas Watch delegation to Bolivia, Uruguay and Argentina. The delegation, headed by Father Roy Bourgeois, successfully persuaded the Ministers of Defense of all three countries to commit to stop sending troops to the School of the Americas (a.k.a. Western Hemisphere Institute for Security Cooperation). Also in 2006, he visited Peru, Chile and Ecuador and met with Ministers of Defense and presidential candidates in an attempt to persuade them to stop sending troops to the School of the Americas and successfully persuaded the Chilean government to do so. In 2007, he visited Nicaragua, El Salvador and Guatemala on a similar mission, but these governments have yet to agree to stop sending troops.

For several consecutive years, Prof. Mauricio drove across country with a group of torture survivors and anti-torture activists to the annual vigil at the School of the Americas speaking to peace and anti-torture organizations along the way. Prof. Mauricio's memoir (or testimonio) is due to be published in Fall 2011. He currently runs an annual course in Salvadoran Human Rights and History at the University of San Salvador and is working to overthrow the post-Peace Accords amnesty as well as to establish a Museum of Historical Memory in the former headquarters of the National Police, where he was tortured.

In 2018 a Feature Film was produced in El Salvador about Carlos Mauricio's story "The Path of the Shadows".

References

News report of trial verdictNews report of responses to verdict
Radio Documentary: Journey to Justice - Carlos Mauricio's story

External links
Carlos Mauricio's Story, at the Center for Justice and Accountability
https://vimeo.com/ondemand/thepathoftheshadows
School of the Americas Watch

Living people
Year of birth missing (living people)
Salvadoran emigrants to the United States